The National Congress for Liberty (CNL), sometimes translated as the National Congress for Freedom is a political party in Burundi. It was originally founded as the National Front for Liberty but changed its name a couple of days later to the current one.

References

2018 establishments in Burundi
Hutu
Political parties established in 2018
Political parties in Burundi